Lachlan was an electoral district of the Legislative Assembly in the Australian state of New South Wales. During the first two Parliaments (1856–1859), there was an electorate in the same area called Lachlan and Lower Darling, named after the Lachlan and Darling Rivers. Lachlan was created in 1859 and abolished in 1880, partly replaced by Forbes. In 1894 Forbes was abolished and Lachlan was recreated. In 1920 Lachlan and Ashburnham were absorbed into Murrumbidgee and elected three members under proportional representation. At the end of proportional representation in 1927, Lachlan was recreated. It was abolished in 1950, recreated in 1981 and abolished in 2007.

The abolition of Lachlan for the 2007 election prompted its member, former Deputy Premier Ian Armstrong to retire at that election rather than seek the option of remaining in Parliament by contesting another seat.

Members for Lachlan

Election results

References 

Former electoral districts of New South Wales
Constituencies established in 1859
1859 establishments in Australia
Constituencies disestablished in 1880
1880 disestablishments in Australia
Constituencies established in 1894
1894 establishments in Australia
Constituencies disestablished in 1920
1920 disestablishments in Australia
Constituencies established in 1927
1927 establishments in Australia
Constituencies disestablished in 1950
1950 disestablishments in Australia
Constituencies established in 1981
1981 establishments in Australia
Constituencies disestablished in 2007
2007 disestablishments in Australia